Novokudashevo (Yañı Qoźaş) is a rural locality (a village) in Starokudashevsky Selsoviet, Yanaulsky District, Bashkortostan, Russia. The population was 4 as of 2010. There are 2 streets.

Geography 
Novokudashevo is located 37 km southwest of Yanaul (the district's administrative centre) by road. Kyrpy is the nearest rural locality.

References 

Rural localities in Yanaulsky District